The Shanghai Korean School (SKS; ,  "Shanghai South Korea School") is a South Korean international school in Huacao Town, Minhang District, Shanghai. It serves elementary school through senior high school students.

The Chinese Ministry of Education (MOE) approved the school for teaching foreigners on October 27, 1999, and on June 2, 2006, the MOE permitted the school to establish senior high school classes.

See also
 Korean community of Shanghai
 Korean International School in Beijing

References

External links
 Shanghai Korean School 

International schools in Shanghai
Shanghai